Hakon Aasnæs (2 November 1894 – 28 September 1973) was a Norwegian sport shooter. He was born in the municipality of Sande in Vestfold, and was a cousin of fellow Olympic sport shooter Hans Aasnæs. He represented the club Oslo Østre Skytterlag. He competed at the 1936 Summer Olympics, where he placed 23rd in small-bore rifle, 50 metre.

References

1894 births
1973 deaths
People from Sande, Vestfold
Norwegian male sport shooters
Olympic shooters of Norway
Shooters at the 1936 Summer Olympics
Sportspeople from Vestfold og Telemark
20th-century Norwegian people